The Thessalian Radio Television, also known as TRT (Thessaliki Radiofonia Tileorasi), was founded in 1989. It is a regional private television station that broadcasts in the region of Thessaly, Greece. It started broadcasting on 5 February 1990.

TRT has studios in five cities (Volos, Larissa, Karditsa, Trikala and Athens). The station broadcasts continuously and its programmes are targeted at a broad audience of all ages.

Radio TRT 95.1
Radio TRT 95.1 was launched on 29 October 1995 from the TRT studios of Larissa. The station operates around the clock, with a full program of entertaining and informative, with the collaboration of highly skilled and experienced journalists and producers, as well as many new outstanding partners. In a short time spent at the top of the ratings. From November 2011 rebroadcasts with Real FM 97.8.

References

External links

Radio TRT 95,1 Larissa - official website

Greek-language television stations
Television channels in Greece
Mass media in Thessaly
Television channels and stations established in 1989
1989 establishments in Greece
Companies based in Larissa